Monthly income preferred stock or MIPS is a hybrid security created by Eli Jacobson, a Sullivan & Cromwell tax partner, and introduced to the market by Goldman Sachs in 1993. In essence, MIPS is a combination of deeply subordinated debt and preferred stock.

MIPS is structured in such a way as to make payments on the security an interest expense for the borrower and dividend for the lender. A special purpose entity of the issuer sells the preferred stock to the public and then lends the proceeds to the parent. The parent's interest payments to the subsidiary are tax-deductible as interest and are used by the SPE to pay preferred dividends to the investors. However, the interest income received by the SPE is not taxable income, because it is organized as a tax-free entity.

Because of these features, MIPS at one point dominated the market for traditional perpetual preferred equity, accounting for over 70% of all new preferred issues. However, MIPS as a tax shelter no longer works.  The credit rating agencies consider MIPS to be preferred stock.

References

External links
Realty Income Declares Monthly Income Preferred Stock Dividends
Popular, Inc. - Noncumulative Monthly Income Preferred Stock 2003 Series A 
Traditional And Synthetic Preferreds Provide More Choices For Individual Investor

Corporate finance
Equity securities
Stock market